Frank Decker (February 26, 1856 in St. Louis, Missouri – February 5, 1940 in St. Louis) was a 19th-century professional baseball player.  Decker played in 3 games for the Syracuse Stars in 1879 and 2 games for the St. Louis Brown Stockings in 1882.

External links

1856 births
1940 deaths
Baseball players from Missouri
Syracuse Stars (NL) players
St. Louis Brown Stockings (AA) players
19th-century baseball players